Pheidole microgyna is a species of ant in the genus Pheidole. It is endemic to Guyana.

References

microgyna
Endemic fauna of Guyana
Hymenoptera of South America
Insects described in 1928
Taxonomy articles created by Polbot